Jonas McCord (born February 13, 1952) is an American screenwriter, director, and producer.

Filmography

References

External links

1952 births
Film directors from Washington, D.C.
American male screenwriters
Living people
Writers from Washington, D.C.
People from Washington, D.C.
Screenwriters from Washington, D.C.